Macedonia participated in the Junior Eurovision Song Contest 2018 which took place on 25 November 2018 in Minsk, Belarus. Macedonian broadcaster MRT was responsible for organising their entry for the contest. Marija Spasovska was internally selected on 18 August 2018 as the Macedonian representative.

Background

In the 2017 contest, Mina Blažev represented her country in Tbilisi, Georgia with the song "Dancing Through Life". The song ended 12th out of 16 entries with 69 points.

Before Junior Eurovision
On 24 August 2018, the Macedonian broadcaster revealed that they had chosen the thirteen-year-old artist Marija Spasovska internally to represent the Republic of North Macedonia in the Junior Eurovision Song Contest 2018. Her song for the contest was revealed on 19 October 2018.

Artist and song information

Marija Spasovska
Marija Spasovska (born 5 October 2005) is a Macedonian singer. She represented Macedonia at the Junior Eurovision Song Contest 2018 in Minsk, Belarus on 25 November 2018.

Marija Spasovska was born on 5 October 2005 year in Skopje the Republic of Macedonia. She has been singing since she was 4. Numerous performances from various manifestations, competitions and promotions. From the experience so far, over twenty awards, praise and diplomas from different music festivals and competitions at the domestic and international level are listed. She has a role in the first Macedonian musical "My Secret" dedicated to Toše Proeski. Her first teenage song "Igraj so srce" (Играј со срце; lit. Play the heart) was released on 30 May 2018.

At Junior Eurovision
During the opening ceremony and the running order draw which both took place on 19 November 2018, Macedonia was drawn to perform sixteenth on 25 November 2018, following France and preceding Armenia.

Voting

Detailed voting results

References

Junior Eurovision Song Contest
Macedonia
2018